Idaga Hamus (Tigrigna "Thursday Market") is a village in northern Ethiopia. Located in the Mirabawi Zone of the Tigray Region (or kilil) of Ethiopia, this town is the largest settlement in Tsegede woreda.

Notes 

Populated places in the Tigray Region